Pilin Tachakittiranan (born June 14, 1983) is a Thai former swimmer, who specialized in freestyle and butterfly events. She is a two-time Olympian (2000 and 2004) and a multiple-time age-group record holder in all freestyle distances (except 1500 m). Regarded as Thailand's top female swimmer, she has won a total of five gold medals at the Southeast Asian Games (2003 and 2005).

Tachakittiranan made her first Thai team, as a 17-year-old teen, at the 2000 Summer Olympics in Sydney. There, she failed to advance into the succeeding round in any of her individual events, finishing forty-fifth in the 50 m freestyle (27.31), thirtieth in the 200 m freestyle (2:05.88), and thirty-ninth each in the 100 m freestyle (58.69) and 400 m freestyle (4:29.28).

At the 2003 Southeast Asian Games in Hanoi, Vietnam, Tachakittiranan dominated the pool for Thailand by claiming a total of three gold medals in the 200, 400, and 800 m freestyle.

At the 2004 Summer Olympics in Athens, Tachakittiranan shortened her swimming program, focusing only on the 200 and 400 m freestyle. She posted FINA B-standard entry times of 2:06.19 (200 m freestyle) and 4:21.67 (400 m freestyle) from the SEA Games. On the second day of the Games, Tachakittiranan placed thirty-fourth overall in the 400 m freestyle. Swimming in heat one, she picked up a third seed by nearly two seconds behind winner Paola Duguet of Colombia in 4:23.62. In her second event, 200 m freestyle, Tachakittiranan ended her Olympic run with a thirty-fifth-place effort from the preliminaries. She posted a lifetime best of 2:05.29 to lead the first heat against Chinese Taipei's Yang Chin-Kuei and Kazakhstan's Yuliya Rissik.

References

1983 births
Living people
Pilin Tachakittiranan
Pilin Tachakittiranan
Swimmers at the 2000 Summer Olympics
Swimmers at the 2004 Summer Olympics
Swimmers at the 2002 Asian Games
Swimmers at the 2006 Asian Games
Pilin Tachakittiranan
Female butterfly swimmers
Southeast Asian Games medalists in swimming
Pilin Tachakittiranan
Pilin Tachakittiranan
Competitors at the 2003 Southeast Asian Games
Competitors at the 2005 Southeast Asian Games
Pilin Tachakittiranan
Pilin Tachakittiranan